Astathes bimaculatoides is a species of beetle in the family Cerambycidae. It was described by Breuning in 1971. It is known from Laos.

References

B
Beetles described in 1971